is a Japanese romantic comedy manga series by Shiro Manta. It has been serialized online via Ichijinsha's Comic POOL digital manga magazine since 2017 and has been collected in ten tankōbon volumes. The manga is licensed in North America by Seven Seas Entertainment. An anime television series adaptation by Doga Kobo aired from October to December 2021.

Plot
Futaba Igarashi, a diminutive and scrappy office worker who is often mistaken for a child, constantly complains about her big and boisterous coworker, Harumi Takeda. However, it is clear to Futaba's friends and coworkers she secretly harbors feelings for Takeda she is struggling with.

Characters

Igarashi is a diminutive young woman with green hair and eyes. Due to her height, she is often mistaken for a child. She is constantly annoyed by her office senpai, Harumi Takeda, who is big, loud, and boisterous. Despite this, however, Igarashi harbors romantic feelings for Takeda, which she struggles to deal with despite it being obvious to everyone else. 

Takeda is a boisterous office worker of great height. In the office, he is in charge of Igarashi and will go out of his way to help her and their other colleagues. His favorite hobby is teasing Igarashi by tousling her hair. While he has stated in the past he likes Igarashi, it is unclear if he harbors any romantic feelings for her. Despite this, he spends most of his time both in and out of the office with Igarashi. 

Sakurai is the most attractive woman in the office, and the object of affection for most of her male coworkers. Though gentle and polite, she does not return any of their advances, largely taking a romantic interest in Kazama because of his perceived lack thereof.

Kazama is a fellow coworker and a good friend of Takeda's. Though he is perpetually stoic, he is also somewhat of a hikikomori with a fondness for video games and women. A running gag features Kazama nonchalantly filming things around the office, particularly embarrassing moments for Igarashi, making him the primary target of her wrath. He has feelings for Sakurai, and may be the only person in the office genuinely interested in her, despite often ogling her breasts.

Kurobe is an athletic woman who is Igarashi's best friend. They have been friends since junior high, meeting on Futaba's first day at her Tokyo school.

Yūto is Tōko's timid younger brother.

Tsukishiro is a coworker of Igarashi's who has a Russian background.  This is evident by her Russian expressions, her references to Siberia, and her love of vodka. She has a tendency to randomly appear next to people when they least expect it.

Igarashi's grandfather who raised her until she was 13, after which she moved to Tokyo. Though he supports her desire for independence, he is overprotective of his granddaughter and often goes to great lengths to make sure she is okay, including being adamant against her dating. Though they butt heads, he and Takeda have a lot in common, sharing the same hobbies and physical prowess. He rides a motorcycle.

Oishi is one of Kazama's two best work friends. He tends to be timid and self-deprecating.

Hijikata is the other of Kazama's two best work friends. He has a massive crush on Sakurai, which she is oblivious to due to her feelings for Kazama.

Media

Manga
The manga series began serialization via Ichijinsha's Comic POOL web magazine in 2017. Seven Seas Entertainment holds the license to publish the manga in English in North America.

Anime
On July 1, 2020, an anime television series adaptation produced by Doga Kobo was announced. The series was directed by Ryota Itoh, with Yoshimi Narita overseeing the series' scripts, Shigemitsu Abe designing the characters, and Hiroaki Tsutsumi composing the series' music. It aired from October 10 to December 26, 2021 on Tokyo MX, BS11, GYT, HTB, Animax, and TUF. Tomori Kusunoki, Saori Hayami, Reina Aoyama, and Aoi Koga performed the opening theme "Annoying! San-san Week!", while Yui Horie performed the ending theme "Niji ga Kakaru made no Hanashi" ("The Story Across the Rainbow"). Funimation licensed the series outside of Asia. Muse Communication has licensed this series in South Asia and Southeast Asia. They licensed the series to Animax Asia for TV broadcasts.

Episode list

Reception
In 2018, the series won the Next Manga Award in the web manga category.

Notes

References

External links
 

Anime series based on manga
Doga Kobo
Ichijinsha manga
Japanese webcomics
Josei manga
Muse Communication
Romantic comedy anime and manga
Seven Seas Entertainment titles
Slice of life anime and manga
Tokyo MX original programming
Webcomics in print
Workplace comics